Le Ying is a retired Chinese swimmer, who specialized in sprint and middle-distance freestyle events. At the 1994 FINA World Championships in Rome, Italy, Le, along with her teammates Shan Ying, Lü Bin, and Le Jingyi, powered past the entire field to capture the 4×100 m freestyle relay title and demolished a new world record of 3:37.91, slicing 1.55 seconds off the standard set by the U.S. team of Nicole Haislett, Angel Martino, Jenny Thompson, and Dara Torres from the 1992 Summer Olympics in Barcelona. The following month, at the Asian Games in Hiroshima, Japan, Le edged out Japan's Eri Yamanoi on the final lap to overhaul a two-minute barrier and claim a gold medal in the 200 m freestyle with a sterling time of 1:59.77.

References

Year of birth missing (living people)
Living people
World record setters in swimming
Chinese female freestyle swimmers
World Aquatics Championships medalists in swimming
Medalists at the FINA World Swimming Championships (25 m)

Asian Games gold medalists for China
Medalists at the 1994 Asian Games
Asian Games medalists in swimming
Swimmers at the 1994 Asian Games